Sanguinho Novo... Arnaldo Baptista Revisitado (Portuguese for New Little Blood... Arnaldo Baptista Revisited) is a tribute album by various artists and bands to Brazilian musician Arnaldo Baptista, famous for his work with influential psychedelic rock band Os Mutantes. It was released in 1989 by Eldorado.

The album's cover was provided by Alain Voss, who previously worked with Os Mutantes designing the cover of their 1972 album Mutantes e Seus Cometas no País do Baurets.

Track listing

Outtakes
Due to time constraints, a cover of "Cyborg" by Black Future was not included in the vinyl version, but appeared as a bonus track in the cassette edition.

References

External links
 Sanguinho Novo... at Discogs
 Sanguinho Novo... at Rate Your Music

1989 compilation albums
Tribute albums
Compilation albums by Brazilian artists